Adjehi Nonma Baru (born 10 December 1991) is a Ivorian professional basketball player who currently plays for Burundian team Urunani. He also represents the Ivory Coast national basketball team. He played college Basketball for College of Charleston Cougars men's basketball

College career
Baru played college basketball for Charleston Cougars from 2011 to 2015. In his freshman year, he averaged 7.8 points and 6.3 rebounds per game, while in his sophomore year he averaged 9.3 points and 8.3 rebounds per game. In his junior year he averaged 8.97 points per game, 7.5 rebounds per game and 1.4 blocks per game, and in his final season he averaged 7.44 points per game, 0.78 assists and 0.56 blocks.

Professional career
Baru went undrafted in the 2015 NBA draft. In the 2015–16 season, he played for Xuventude Baloncesto of LEB Plata, the third division of the Spanish basketball league. He played for the Danish Basketball league side SISU BKin the 2016–17 season. He then played for the Bulgarian league side BC Beroe in the 2017–18 season.  In the 2018–19 season, Baru joined Básquet Coruña, where he averaged 3.1 points and 2.9 rebounds per game.

On 2 March 2020, Baru signed with Ferroviário de Maputo of the Basketball Africa League (BAL). He played with them in the 2021 BAL season in May 2021, and helped the team reach the quarterfinals.

Since 2021, Baru played for Khane Khouzestan in the Iranian Basketball Super League.

In October 2022, Baru was on the roster of Burundian club Urunani for the 2023 BAL qualification games. He had 8 points and 9 rebounds in his debut against ABC.

National team career
Baru represents the Ivory Coast national basketball team. He participated in the 2019 FIBA Basketball World Cup where he averaged 3 points, 2 rebounds and 1 assist per game.

BAL career statistics

|-
| style="text-align:left;"|2021
| style="text-align:left;"|Ferroviário de Maputo
| 3 || 3 || 32.1 || .536 || .000 || .625 || 9.7 || 1.3 || 2.0 || 3.0 || 13.3
|-
|- class="sortbottom"
| style="text-align:center;" colspan="2"|Career
| 3 || 3 || 32.1 || .536 || .000 || .625 || 9.7 || 1.3 || 2.0 || 3.0 || 13.3

References

External links
College stats at Sports-Reference.com

Ferroviário de Maputo (basketball) players
1991 births
Living people
Básquet Coruña players
BC Beroe players
College of Charleston Cougars men's basketball players
Randers Cimbria players
Ivorian men's basketball players
Ivorian expatriate basketball people in Bulgaria
Ivorian expatriate basketball people in Denmark
Ivorian expatriate basketball people in Spain
Ivorian expatriate basketball people in the United States
Power forwards (basketball)
SISU BK players
Sportspeople from Abidjan
2019 FIBA Basketball World Cup players
Urunani BBC players